Rottenwood Creek (also spelled "Rotten Wood Creek") is a stream in Cobb County in the U.S. state of Georgia. It is a tributary to the Chattahoochee River.

Rottenwood Creek was named for Rotten Wood, a local Cherokee Native American.

References

Rivers of Georgia (U.S. state)
Rivers of Cobb County, Georgia